High Times: Singles 1992–2006 is a compilation album by the British band Jamiroquai that was released on 6 November 2006 in the United Kingdom and 8 November 2006 in Japan.

The album was intended to be a collection of the group's singles, but it is more widely known as a collection of the band's best-known hits, as it does not include the singles "Stillness in Time", "Half the Man" (available on both the regular and deluxe Japanese pressings), "Light Years", "Supersonic", "King for a Day" and "You Give Me Something" , as well as omitting the international-only singles "The Kids" and "Black Capricorn Day".

The album also includes two newly recorded songs, "Runaway" and "Radio". The album ended Jamiroquai's tumultuous contract with Sony BMG. The album peaked at No. 1 on the UK Albums Chart.

Background
The album received relatively heavy promotion for a greatest-hits album. Posters promoting the album were found in some cities, and many promotional performances were also held, with the most notable one being the London Jazz Cafe performance, which is notable for being the first Jamiroquai performance in the last few years that included wind instruments. The album was also heavily promoted via the internet, most notably via Yahoo! Answers, where a competition to win an MP3 player that contains the album was held. 
The sleeve art for the album features Jay Kay's signature Silver Crown headpiece photographed on a beach with rock formations. In promotional images of the album, a reflection of the photographer shooting the image can be seen in the hat's surface; however, in the cover of the actual release, the reflection of the photographer was erased from the image.

2022 vinyl release 
In December 2022, 16 years after its original release, High Times: Singles 1992–2006 was released on vinyl for the first time, including a standard version and a special-edition green vinyl version and a collector's booklet. The vinyl release also saw the inclusion of "You Give Me Something", which had been omitted from previous audio-based releases.

Track listing

 Japanese bonus tracks
 20. "Half the Man" – 4:50

 Deluxe edition bonus disc
 "Emergency on Planet Earth" (Masters at Work Remix) – 7:10
 "Space Cowboy" (David Morales Remix) – 7:52
 "Love Foolosophy" (Knee Deep Remix) – 8:27
 "Little L" (Bob Sinclar Remix) – 7:24
 "Cosmic Girl" (Tom Belton Remix) – 7:46
 "Dynamite" (Restless Souls Remix) – 7:40
 "Seven Days in Sunny June" (Ashley Beedle Heavy Disco Vocal Remix) – 7:54
 "Virtual Insanity" (Salaam Remi Remix) – 5:41
 "You Give Me Something" (Blacksmith R&B Remix) – 4:02
 "Supersonic" (Restless Souls Remix) – 8:26

 Japanese bonus tracks
 11. "Runaway" (Tom Belton Remix) – 3:29
 12. "Feels So Good" (Knee Deep Remix) – 3:44
 13. "Love Foolosophy" (Mondo Grosso Love Acoustic Mix) – 4:43

 Japanese super deluxe edition bonus DVD
 "Too Young to Die"
 "Emergency on Planet Earth"
 "Space Cowboy"
 "Half the Man"
 "Virtual Insanity"
 "Cosmic Girl"
 "Deeper Underground"
 "Canned Heat"
 "Little L"
 "Love Foolosophy"
 "Feels Just Like It Should"
 "Seven Days in Sunny June"
 "Runaway"

 UK DVD video album
 "When You Gonna Learn" – 3:49
 "Too Young to Die" – 3:23
 "Blow Your Mind" – 3:56
 "Emergency on Planet Earth" – 3:37
 "If I Like It, I Do It" – 4:47
 "Space Cowboy" – 3:37
 "Half the Man" – 4:50
 "Light Years" – 5:13
 "Stillness in Time" – 4:15
 "Virtual Insanity" – 3:49
 "Cosmic Girl" – 3:47
 "Alright" – 3:42
 "High Times" – 4:10
 "Deeper Underground" – 4:46
 "Canned Heat" – 3:48
 "Supersonic" – 5:02
 "King for a Day" – 3:41
 "Black Capricorn Day" – 4:02
 "Little L" – 3:59
 "You Give Me Something" – 3:21
 "Love Foolosophy" – 3:47
 "Corner of the Earth" – 3:56
 "Feels Just Like It Should" – 4:33
 "Seven Days in Sunny June" – 4:02
 "(Don't) Give Hate a Chance" – 3:51
 "Runaway" – 3:46
 "The Making of Little L" – 8:16
 4× mini movie clips
 "The Lost J-Wave Interview"

Charts

Weekly charts

Year-end charts

Certifications

References

2006 greatest hits albums
Jamiroquai compilation albums
2006 video albums
Music video compilation albums
Sony Music compilation albums
Sony Music video albums